Pacific Front Recordings is a Canadian independent record label founded in 2004 in Victoria, British Columbia by Justin Humber and Davin Greenwell.  They operate the label under the monikers Formulate and AFK, respectively.

Discography 
 PFR001: AFK - Magnetic

See also 

 List of record labels
 List of electronic music record labels

External links 
 Pacific Front Recordings Official site
 Pacific Front Recordings at Discogs

Record labels established in 2004
Record labels disestablished in 2009
Canadian independent record labels
Electronic music record labels